Abu Hassan Penchuri (Abu Hassan The Thief) is a 1955 Singaporean Malay-language romantic fantasy film directed by B. N. Rao and starring P. Ramlee, Mariam, Nordin Ahmad.

Cast
 P. Ramlee as Abu Hassan
 Mariam Baharum (aka Tahi Lalat) as Puteri Faridah 
 Nordin Ahmad as Putera Raja Tartar
 Mohd Hamid (Ahmad C) as Kassim
 Daeng Idris as Bapa Puteri Faridah
 Malik Sutan Muda 
 S. Shamsuddin
 Ali Rahman 
 Shariff Dol 
 Wan Hazim 
 Habsah

References

External links

Abu Hassan Penchuri / 1955 - Filem Malaysia

1955 films
1950s romantic fantasy films
Malaysian black-and-white films
Malay-language films
Singaporean black-and-white films
Films scored by P. Ramlee
Malay Film Productions films
Malaysian romance films
Malaysian fantasy films
Films shot in Singapore
Films set in Baghdad
Films about poverty